NXT UK is a professional wrestling television programme that was produced exclusively in the United Kingdom by the American promotion WWE. It aired on BT Sport and 5Action (previously known as Paramount Network). In the United States, the show was available to stream on Peacock, while in other countries, it aired on the WWE Network. The show featured competitors from WWE's NXT UK brand. The show was officially announced during the 2018 United Kingdom Championship Tournament. The final episode of the programme aired on 1 September 2022, following the announcement that the NXT UK brand would be replaced by NXT Europe in 2023.

History
In a press conference at The O2 Arena on 15 December 2016, Triple H revealed that there would be a 16-man tournament to crown the inaugural WWE United Kingdom Champion. The tournament was held over a two-day period, 14 and 15 January 2017, and aired exclusively on the WWE Network. At the time, it was stated that the championship would be the centerpiece of a new UK-based show produced in the UK, but since the inaugural tournament, it was defended on NXT as well as at independent shows in the United Kingdom. The name of the show, NXT UK, and its premiere was finally revealed during the 2018 United Kingdom Championship Tournament. On 7 June 2018, Johnny Saint was appointed General Manager of WWE's United Kingdom-based brand, officially called NXT UK.

The show had its first tapings in August 2018, and the premiere episode of NXT UK aired on 17 October 2018. Starting October 31 with the third and fourth episodes, new episodes were premiered in a double header format each week. On 12 January 2019, the first live special episode of NXT UK aired, called NXT UK TakeOver: Blackpool. Beginning with the 16 January episode, NXT UK returned to airing one episode each week. In September 2019, Triple H stated that NXT UK was the second most watched programme on the WWE Network, behind NXT. In October 2019, the show moved to Thursdays.

Beginning on 2 January 2020, NXT UK began airing on BT Sport On 21 January 2020, it was announced that NXT UK will also be airing on Paramount Network (now known as 5Action). Due to the COVID-19 pandemic, NXT UK suspended production in April 2020. It returned to air in September 2020, with the programme moving to the BT Sport studio.

On 18 August 2022, WWE announced that the NXT UK brand would be entering a hiatus in September and would be rebranded as NXT Europe in 2023. The final episode of NXT UK aired on 1 September.

Special episodes

On-air personalities

Authority figures

Commentators

Ring announcers

Backstage interviewers

See also

Professional wrestling in the United Kingdom

Notes

References

External links

 
WWE Network shows
BT Sport original programming
WWE international
2018 British television series debuts
2022 British television series endings